Luis Hernán Franco Fariña (born 10 April 1999) is a Paraguayan footballer who plays as a goalkeeper.

Club career

Sol de América
Franco was born in Ciudad del Este and is a product of Sol de América. Three days after his 20th birthday, he got his official debut for the club in the Paraguayan Primera División against Club Olimpia. Goalkeeper Rubén Escobar was sent off, after having committed a penalty in the 41st minute. Franco could't do anything to stop the goal and América lost 0–4. Franco also got the chance in the following three games, of which they won one and lost two.

In the 2020 season, Franco was used in five games where he conceded 12 goals.

References

External links
 

Living people
1999 births
Association football goalkeepers
Paraguayan footballers
Paraguayan Primera División players
Club Sol de América footballers
People from Ciudad del Este